Amorphophallus minimus is a species of corpse flower found in the Philippines endemic to the Pantabangan-Carranglan Watershed Forest Reserve, Nueva Ecija province. Amorphophallus minimus is 24 cm in height (making it the smallest species in the genus Amorphophallus  in the Philippines) and is the 17th known species in the genus Amorphophallus in the Philippines and is the 198th species of the genus Amorphophallus worldwide. The species has a rust colouration with a lichen like pattern. Amorphophallus minimus grows at an elevation of 950 to 1,400 meters (3,100 to 4,600 feet) and has a small habitat range.

 The Philippine Taxonomic Initiative (PTI) has recognized Amorphophallus minimus as a new species in 2021.

References 

minimus
Flora of the Philippines